Robert F. Kennedy (1925–1968) was an American politician who is often referred to by his initials RFK.

RFK may also refer to:

RFK (film), a 2002 television movie about him
RFK (2004), a television documentary directed by David Grubin
Robert F. Kennedy Jr. (born 1954), lawyer, journalist, author, and son of Robert F. Kennedy
Robert F. Kennedy Memorial Stadium, Washington DC
Triborough Bridge, known officially as the Robert F. Kennedy Bridge since 2008, and sometimes referred to as the RFK Triborough Bridge
Roush Fenway Keselowski Racing, or RFK Racing, a NASCAR team

Acronyms
Rīgas FK, a Latvian football club
robotfindskitten, a computer game